James Dewar (1797 – 25 November 1830) was a British jurist and a chief justice of the Supreme Court of Bombay.

Early life
Dewar was born in Leuchars, Fife. He was the son of Major General David Dewar and Marry Cutler. Dewar was admitted to Middle Temple in 1821 and entitled to practice as a barrister. He married Clementine Wemyss, daughter of William Wemyss in 1826. He lived at Cuttle Hill, Scotland.

Career
Dewar initially practised in England then moved to British India in June 1827. He was appointed as clerk of the Crown thereafter started practice in Bombay. He was elevated in the post of the Chief Justice of the Supreme Court Judicature of Bombay Presidency on 11 September 1829. He was Knighted in 1829. Dewar died on 25 November 1830 at the early age of thirty three. His son was the cricketer and British Army officer James Dewar, Jr.

References

1797 births
1830 deaths
Chief Justices of the Bombay High Court
British India judges
Members of the Middle Temple
Knights Bachelor
People from Leuchars